Mary of Scotland is a 1936 RKO film starring Katharine Hepburn as the 16th-century ruler Mary, Queen of Scots. Directed by John Ford, it is an adaptation of the 1933 Maxwell Anderson play, with Fredric March reprising the role of Bothwell, which he also performed on stage during the run of play. The screenplay was written by Dudley Nichols. Ginger Rogers wanted to play this role and made a screen test, but RKO rejected her request to be cast in the part feeling that the role was not suitable to her image.

Plot summary
Note: Someone copied this plot summary from the TCM.com article. Wikipedia forbids this.
Mary (Katharine Hepburn), by assuming her throne as queen of Scotland, strikes terror into the heart of Queen Elizabeth I (Florence Eldridge). After languishing in jail for 18 years at Elizabeth's command, Mary is offered a pardon if she will sign away her throne. Will she accept the deal, or die instead?

Cast

Accuracy 

The film does not keep close to the historical truth, portraying Mary as a wronged martyr and her third husband, James Hepburn, Earl of Bothwell, a direct ancestor of Katharine Hepburn played by Fredric March), as a romantic hero. While it is true that Bothwell was well known as a philanderer, his last marriage to Mary was genuine. Regarding Mary's historical status, the false imprisonment by Elizabeth I and Anglo Protestant intrigue in Scotland did undermine her claim to the throne of Scotland and the throne of England, making her a direct threat to Elizabeth I.

At the beginning of the movie, Mary is described as the legitimate heir of King Henry VII of England, when in fact she was the heir of King James V of Scotland.

Reception 

Contemporary reviews were generally positive. Frank S. Nugent of The New York Times wrote it had a "blend of excellence and mere adequacy." He wrote that the film had "depth, vigor and warm humanity" but had scenes which "lack the vitality they possessed in the play", and considered Hepburn's characterization of the title role rather too soft in comparison with the historical Mary. Variety praised the "extra-strong cast" and Ford's "sure-footed" direction. Hepburn's performance was described as "not really Mary Stuart but rather Katie Hepburn. And that is all in the film's favor because it humanizes it all and makes it that much more nearly acceptable." However, the review also found the film too long and the ending too sad, and conceding it could not end any other way without "completely corrupting history." "Impressive historical drama finely acted and produced with all-around distinction", reported Film Daily. Motion Picture Daily called the film "a splendidly powerful drama" with a "sincere, intelligent and genuine" performance by Hepburn. Russell Maloney reviewed the film negatively in The New Yorker, writing that despite its high production values, "it has little or nothing to do with Maxwell Anderson's play. Any other historical drama of the period could have been sandwiched in between these scenes and it wouldn't have made a bit of difference." Of Hepburn's performance, Maloney wrote that she had "the cards stacked against her from the very start, because pageantry naturally interferes with characterization."

The film is not regarded well by critics today, and in its time, it was a box office flop, causing a loss of $165,000. This was Katharine Hepburn's second flop in a row, causing her to being labeled "box office poison" in the late 1930s, leading to (after a two-year screen absence) her move to MGM for her comeback in The Philadelphia Story in 1940.

References

External links

 
 
 
 
 Mary of Scotland at Virtual History
 Radio adaptation of original play done for Theatre Guild on the Air in 1946 at Internet Archive

1936 films
Films set in the 16th century
Films set in Tudor England
American historical drama films
American films based on plays
American black-and-white films
Films directed by John Ford
Films set in Scotland
Films about Mary, Queen of Scots
Films about Elizabeth I
1930s historical drama films
Films with screenplays by Dudley Nichols
Films scored by Nathaniel Shilkret
1936 drama films
RKO Pictures films
1930s English-language films
1930s American films